Vrh pri Višnji Gori is a settlement in the hills to the north above Višnja Gora in the Municipality of Ivančna Gorica in central Slovenia. The area is part of the historical region of Lower Carniola. The municipality is now included in the Central Slovenia Statistical Region.

Name
The name of the settlement was changed from Vrh to Vrh pri Višnji Gori in 1953. In the past the German name was Greifenberg.

Cultural heritage
A number of Late Bronze Age and Early Iron Age graves have been found in and around the village. An inventory of the graves and finds is kept by the Vienna Museum of Natural History

References

External links

Vrh pri Višnji Gori on Geopedia

Populated places in the Municipality of Ivančna Gorica